This list of the prehistoric life of Delaware contains the various prehistoric life-forms whose fossilized remains have been reported from within the US state of Delaware.

Precambrian-Paleozoic
The Paleobiology Database records no known occurrences of Precambrian or Paleozoic fossils in Delaware.

Mesozoic

Selected Mesozoic taxa of Delaware

  †Acteon
 †Aenona – tentative report
 †Agerostrea
 †Ampullina
 †Anaklinoceras
 †Anomia
 †Anomoeodus
  †Apsopelix
 †Apsopelix anglicus
 †Arca
 Architectonica – or unidentified comparable form
 Arrhoges
 Astarte – tentative report
 †Avellana
 †Baculites
 †Baculites haresi
 †Baculites ovatus
 Barbatia
  †Belemnitella
 †Belemnitella americana
 Bernaya
  †Bonnerichthys
 †Bulla
 Cadulus
 Caestocorbula
 †Caestocorbula crassiplica
 †Calliomphalus
 †Calliomphalus americanus – tentative report
 †Calliomphalus nudus
 Capulus
 †Caveola
 Cerithium
 Clavagella
  †Clidastes – or unidentified comparable form
 Cliona
 †Coelosaurus
 †Coelosaurus antiquus
 Corbula
 †Crenella
 †Crenella serica
  †Cretolamna
 †Cretolamna appendiculata
 Cucullaea
 Cuspidaria
 †Cuspidaria grandis
 Cylichna
 †Cymella
 †Dentalium
  †Didymoceras
 †Didymoceras binodosum
 †Didymoceras cheyennense
 †Didymoceras platycostatum
 †Didymoceras stevensoni
  †Dryptosaurus
 †Ecphora – tentative report
 Emarginula
 †Enchodus
 †Euspira
 †Eutrephoceras
 †Exiteloceras
  †Exogyra
 †Exogyra cancellata
 †Exogyra costata
 †Exogyra ponderosa
 Gastrochaena
 †Gegania
 Ginglymostoma
  †Globidens
 †Globidens alabamensis
 Glossus
 Glycymeris
 †Halisaurus
 †Halisaurus platyspondylus
 †Hamulus
 Haustator – or unidentified comparable form
 †Hoploscaphites
 †Hybodus
 †Inoceramus
 †Ischyodus
 †Ischyodus bifurcatus
 †Ischyrhiza
 †Ischyrhiza avonicola – or unidentified comparable form
 †Ischyrhiza mira
  †Jeletzkytes
 Lepisosteus – or unidentified comparable form
 Lima
 †Linearis
 †Lingula – tentative report
 †Lissodus
 Lithophaga
  Lopha
 †Lopha falcata
 †Lucina
 Martesia
 †Mathilda
 †Menuites
 †Morea – or unidentified comparable form
 †Neithea
 †Neithea quinquecostata
 Nucula
 †Nucula percrassa
  Odontaspis
 †Ornithomimus
 Ostrea
 †Pachydiscus
 †Pachymelania
 Panopea
 †Paralbula
 † Paranomia
 Patella
 †Pecten
 Pholadomya
 †Pholadomya occidentalis
 Pholas – tentative report
 †Pinna
 †Placenticeras
 Plicatula
 †Pseudocorax
  †Pteranodon – tentative report
 †Pteria
 †Pterotrigonia
 †Pterotrigonia eufaulensis
 †Ptychotrygon
 Pycnodonte
 †Pycnodonte mutabilis
 Rhinobatos
  †Rhombodus
 Ringicula
 †Sargana
 †Scapanorhynchus
 †Scapanorhynchus texanus
 †Scaphites
 †Scaphites hippocrepis
 †Sclerorhynchus
 Serpula
 Spondylus
  Squalicorax
 †Squalicorax falcatus
 †Squalicorax kaupi
 †Squalicorax pristodontus
 Squatina
 †Stephanodus
 Tellina
 †Tenea
 †Toxochelys
 Trachycardium
 †Trachycardium eufaulensis
 †Trigonia
 Trionyx
 Turritella
 †Turritella tippana
 †Turritella trilira
 †Turritella vertebroides
  †Tylosaurus
 Tympanotonos – or unidentified comparable form
 Xenophora
  †Xiphactinus

Cenozoic

Selected Cenozoic taxa of Delaware

  †Amphicyon
 Anadara
 †Anadara ovalis
 †Anchitheriomys
  †Anchitherium
 Anomia
 †Anomia simplex
 †Archaeohippus
 Argopecten
 †Argopecten irradians
  Astarte
 Astyris
 Barnea
 Busycon
 †Busycon perversum
 Busycotypus
 †Busycotypus canaliculatus
 Cadulus
 Caecum
  Calliostoma
 Calyptraea
 †Calyptraea centralis
 Cancellaria
 Carcharhinus
 †Carcharhinus brachyurus
 †Carcharhinus limbatus
 †Carcharhinus perezii
 Carcharodon
  †Carcharodon hastalis
 Carditamera
 Cerastoderma – report made of unidentified related form or using admittedly obsolete nomenclature
  †Chesapecten
 †Chrysodomus
 Clementia
 Corbula
 Crassostrea
 †Crassostrea virginica
 Crepidula
 †Crepidula fornicata
 †Crepidula plana
  Crocodylus
 Crucibulum
 Cyclocardia
 Cymatosyrinx
 Cymia
  †Cynelos
 Diastoma
 Dinocardium
 Diodora
 Donax
 Dosinia
 †Ecphora
 Ensis
 †Ensis directus
 Epitonium
 Euspira
 †Euspira heros
 Ficus
  Galeocerdo
 †Galeocerdo aduncus
 †Galeocerdo contortus
 Gavia
 Gemma
 †Gemma gemma
 Geochelone
 Geukensia
 †Geukensia demissa
 Glossus
 Glycymeris
 Hemipristis
  †Hemipristis serra
 Ilyanassa
 †Ilyanassa obsoleta
 †Ilyanassa trivittata
 †Inodrillia
 †Inodrillia whitfieldi
 Iphigenia
 Isognomon
 Isurus
 †Isurus oxyrinchus
 Kinosternon
 †Leptophoca
 †Leptophoca lenis
 Leucosyrinx
 Littorina
  Lunatia
 Macoma
 †Macoma balthica
 Macrocallista
 Mactra – report made of unidentified related form or using admittedly obsolete nomenclature
 Martesia
  Melanella
 Mercenaria
  †Mercenaria mercenaria
 †Metatomarctus
 Metula
  Modiolus
 †Monosaulax
 Morus
 Mulinia
 †Mulinia lateralis
 Murexiella
 †Mya
 †Mya arenaria
 Mytilopsis
 Mytilus
 †Mytilus edulis
  Nassarius
 †Nassarius vibex
 Neverita
  Notorynchus
 Nucula
 Oliva
 Ophisaurus
 Panopea
 †Paracynarctus
  †Parahippus
 †Parahippus leonensis
 Pecten
 Petricola
 †Petricola pholadiformis
 †Phocageneus
 Pholas
 Polystira
 †Ptychosalpinx
  Rhincodon
 Scaphella
  †Schizodelphis
 Seila
 †Seila adamsii
 Semele
 Serpulorbis
 Sinum
 Siphonalia
  †Squalodon
 †Squalodon calvertensis
 Squalus
 Squatina
 Stewartia
 Tagelus
 Tegula
 Teinostoma
 Terebra
 Trigonostoma
 Trochita
 Turritella
 †Tylocephalonyx – or unidentified comparable form
 Typhis
 Uca
  †Uca pugnax
 Urosalpinx
 Yoldia

See also 

 Geology of Delaware

References

External links 
 

Delaware